The Great Park is a public park located in Irvine, California, with a focus on sports, agriculture, and the arts. It is a non-aviation reuse of the decommissioned Marine Corps Air Station (MCAS) El Toro. The Orange County park comprises 28.8% of the total area that once made up the air base. The project was approved by the voters of Orange County in 2002 at $1.1 billion.

History

The Great Park was the site of Marine Corps Air Station El Toro from 1943–1999. In 1993, the Base Realignment and Closure Commission recommended closing MCAS El Toro and transferring its activities to Marine Corps Air Station Miramar. This led to a lengthy political and public relations battle over the subsequent use of the base after its closure, and the issue figured prominently in Orange County politics during the late 1990s. Initial proposals included a commercial airport, housing, and the Great Park. In 2001, Orange County voters passed Measure W, authorizing the former air station's use as a central park/nature preserve and multi-use development. The measure was passed, which led to the designation of the land as the Great Park.

The original plan for the infrastructure of the Great Park was virtually identical to Newport Center, with five roads connecting into a central loop road separating the park into blocks. The design was later modified to include a large section of runway and conform more to the layout of the original base, as a reminder of its history. Most prominent in the park plans is the restoration of Agua Chinon Creek, which had been channeled underground ever since the base was built in the 1940s.

A contest was held for the design of the park; the winning design was created by a team of landscape architects led by Ken Smith.

In the midst of the 2008 US housing crisis, developer Lennar struggled to fulfill its part of the bargain, including delayed construction of planned housing and of a "community facilities district."

The Irvine City Council passed a vote in July 2014 for a plan that included removal of the canyon from the Great Park plan. FivePoint Communities was also given approval for 4,606 more homes near the park in exchange for $200 million to develop 688 acres (known locally as the "Not So Great Park") of the park which will include golf courses, a sports park, and nature trails. The remaining 3,994 acres or 85% went to developers and additional city infrastructure.

The park has become a political football in Irvine city politics, with historical proponents of the airport and opponents of the park criticizing the implementation.  In 2012, political opponents of long-term City Councilmember Larry Agran — including newly-elected Mayor Steven Choi and Councilmembers Christina Shea and Jeff Lalloway — won a 3-2 majority on the City Council, and called for another audit of Great Park expenditures.  Agran and the other members of the City Council voted for the new audit, specifying that the cost should not exceed $250,000.  Councilmembers Christina Shea and Jeff Lalloway appointed themselves to a newly constituted City Council Subcommittee charged with overseeing the audit.  Through this two-person Subcommittee, Shea and Lalloway hired an accounting firm to conduct the audit: Hagen, Streiff, Newton & Oshiro (HSNO).  The HSNO accounting firm was hired without a public bidding process. The Shea-Lalloway City Council subcommittee commissioned a forensic audit which claimed mismanagement of public dollars at the park.   In January 2020, the accounting firm in charge of the audit, Hagen Streiff Newton & Oshiro, Accountants, lost its professional license and charged $550,000 in fines, as the California Board of Accountancy said the firm “failed to comply with professional standards, engaged in numerous acts of negligence, and disseminated false and misleadingly information” in performing the Great Park audit.

Description 
Great Park was designed by a team of landscape architects led by architect Ken Smith. Smith's plan was chosen from those submitted as part of an international contest for the park's design.

The park is owned by the City of Irvine and run by the non-profit Great Park Corporation; the corporation is governed by current city council members.

Points of interest
The Great Park has a variety of attractions and activities centering around the fitness, agriculture, and the arts. The Great Park also has venues for special events including a restored hangar and a terraced lawn.

Attractions
The Great Park Balloon is the park's signature attraction. On July 14, 2007, the balloon ride—designed and operated by Aerophile SA—was the first attraction to open in the park. The balloon's gondola can fit 25–30 people, large enough to bring up a class of students.
The Great Park Carousel

Agriculture
Certified farmers' market
The Farm+Food Lab

Sports and recreation
Great Park Ice & FivePoint Arena - Four sheet ice rink facility (three NHL, one Olympic).
2,500-seat Championship Soccer Stadium - Home to Orange County SC and California United Strikers FC
24 additional soccer fields
Five sand volleyball courts
Four basketball courts
25 tennis courts 
12 softball and baseball fields

Kids rock and playground
Reflecting ponds and viewing pier

Arts
Hangar 244—permanent heritage and aviation exhibition
Palm Court Arts Complex
Walkable historical timeline

Construction and future projects
The sports complex construction took place over multiple phases. The project was completed with the grand opening of the baseball and softball facilities in September 2018.

The park's ice facility had a ground breaking ceremony hosted by the NHL's Anaheim Ducks in February 2017. The  facility includes four ice sheets to support a variety of professional, youth, and adult programs including figure skating, hockey, curling, and broomball. It opened in December 2018.

The City of Irvine is considering including an amphitheater, museums, and a library, and in June 2017 approved an exclusive negotiating agreement with Wild Rivers, a water park that operated further south in Irvine for 25 years before closing in 2011 when its lease expired. The new  water park is planned to open in May 2022. Some residents are urging the inclusion of a botanical garden.   of the Cultural Terrace section are leased to a company that operates a green waste and recycling plant there.

A wildlife corridor between chaparral areas near Laguna Beach and the Cleveland National Forest in the Santa Ana Mountains opened in mid-2019;  of a total  required restoration.

See also
 Irvine Transportation Center at the southwest corner of the parkland

References

External links

 
 Great Park Neighborhoods
 3D GIS Interactive Model
 Orange County Great Park Ambassadors Blog
 Orange County Great Park

Geography of Irvine, California
Municipal parks in California
Parks in Orange County, California
USL Championship stadiums
Sports complexes in the United States